Ettore Peretti (14 March 1958, Costermano sul Garda – 28 January 2018) was an Italian politician.

Born on 14 March 1958, Peretti was a member of the Union of the Centre. He served on the Chamber of Deputies between 1994 and 2008, and died of a heart attack while playing tennis on 28 January 2018.

References

1958 births
2018 deaths
People from the Province of Verona
Union of the Centre (2002) politicians
Deputies of Legislature XV of Italy
Politicians of Veneto